The order of battle for the Battle of France details the hierarchy of the major combatant forces in the Battle of France in May 1940.

Comparative ranks

Allies 

The bulk of the forces of the Allies were French, although the United Kingdom (British Expeditionary Force), Netherlands, and Belgium had significant forces in the battle opposing Germany. Supreme Command was held by the French Commander-in-Chief Général d'armée Maurice Gamelin, his deputy Général d'armée Alphonse Joseph Georges was appointed Commander of the North Western Front.

French First Army Group 

The First Army Group guarded the north-east frontier of France, ready to move into Belgium and the Netherlands to oppose any German invasion of those nations. The First controlled four French armies as well as the Belgian Army and the British Expeditionary Force. Général d'armée Gaston Billotte was Commander-in-Chief until his death in a car crash on 23 May 1940, Général d'armée Georges Maurice Jean Blanchard was appointed to succeed him.

 First Army - Général d'armée Georges Maurice Jean Blanchard
 Cavalry Corps - Général de corps d'armée René Prioux (vs. Hoeppner's XVI Pz Corps @ Hannut)
 2nd Light Mechanized Division - Général de brigade Gabriel-Marie-Joseph Bougrain (vs. Hoeppner Corps)
 3rd Light Mechanized Division - Général de brigade Jean-Léon-Albert Langlois  
 3rd Corps - General de Fornel de la Laurencie
 1st Motorized Infantry Division
 1st Moroccan Infantry Division
 2nd North African Infantry Division
 4th Corps - Général de division Aymes
 32nd Infantry Division
 15th Motorized Infantry Division - Général de brigade Alphonse Juin
 5th Corps - Général de corps d'armée René Altmayer
 5th North African Infantry Division
 101st Infantry Division
 Belgian VII Corps
 2nd Chasseurs Ardennais - Général de brigade Maurice-Colombe-Louis Keyaerts  (at Chabrehez and Houx vs. 7th Pz Div)
 8th Infantry Division
 Second Army - Général d'armée Charles Huntziger
 Directly reporting: (dispositions north to south)
 5th Light Cavalry Division - Général de brigade Marie-Jacques-Henri Chanoine  (to Neufchateau-Bastogne, vs Guderian 1st and 2nd Pz, evacuated Sedan)
 2nd Light Cavalry Division (to Habay La Neuve, Arlon Gap, vs 10th Pz Div)
 1st Cavalry Brigade
 Directly reporting: (Reserves)
4th Tank Battalion
7th Tank Battalion
205th Inf Regt
213th Inf Regt - Lt Colonel Labarthé
 10th Corps - Général de corps d'armée Pierre-Paul-Jacques Grandsard 
 55th Infantry Division - Général de brigade Henri-Jean LaFontaine  (Donchery and La Marfee on the Meuse, vs Guderian, 1st, 2nd Pz Divs.)
 71st Infantry Division - Général de brigade Joseph-Antoine-Jacques-Louis Baudet  (Wadelincourt on the Meuse and Raucourt, vs Guderian's 10th Pz Div)
 3rd North African Infantry Division (South of 71st Div)
 18th Corps - Général de division Paul-André Doyen
 1st Colonial Infantry Division
 3rd Colonial Infantry Division
 41st Infantry Division
 Seventh Army - Général d'armée Henri Giraud
 Directly reporting:
 21st Infantry Division
 60th Infantry Division
 68th Infantry Division
 1st Corps
 1st Light Mechanized Division
 25th Motorized Division - Général de division Molinié
 16th Corps
 9th Motorized Division
 Ninth Army - Général d'armée André Corap
 Directly reporting:
 4th North African Infantry Division - Général de division Charles-Èugene Sancelme  (at Onhaye, vs 7th Pz Div)
 53rd Infantry Division - Général de brigade Jean-Marie-Léon Etchberrigaray (vs 2nd Pz)
 2nd Corps Général de corps d'armée Jean-Gabriel Bouffet 
 4th Light Cavalry Division - Général de division Paul-Louis-Arthur Barbe  (deployed into the Ardennes, across the Meuse to the Ourthe, then Marche, vs 7th Pz Div)
 5th Motorized Division - Général de brigade Jean-Noël-Louis Boucher  (Haut-le-Wastia, vs 7th Pz)
 11th Corps - Général de corps d'armée Julien-Françoise-René Martin
 1st Light Cavalry Division
 18th Infantry Division - Général de division Camille-Léon Duffet  (on the Meuse at Houx, vs 7th Pz Div)
66th Regt
77th Regt
125th Regt
 22nd Infantry Division - Général de brigade Joseph-Louis-Françoise Hassler  (Givet on the Meuse, vs 7th Pz Div)
 41st Corps - Général de corps d'armée Emmanuel-Urbain Libaud 
 61st Infantry Division - Général de brigade Arsène-Marie Paul Vauthier (N of Monthermé vs 8 Pz Div)
 102nd Fortress Division - Général de division Françoise-Arthur Portzert  (Monthermé, vs 6th Pz Div)
  - Colonel Marc (La Horgne v 1st Pz)
 French Armored Reserves (near Rheims to SW of breakthrough area)
1st Armored Division - Général de brigade Marie-Germain-Christian Bruneau  (deployed to Charleroi then to Flavion, arrived low on fuel or out of fuel, vs 7 Pz Div and then 5th Pz Div)
2nd Armored Division - Général de brigade Albert-Charles-Émile Bruché  (to Signy, deployed piecemeal, destroyed by Reinhardt's XLI Pz Corps)
3rd Armored Division - Général de brigade Georges-Louis Brocard  (to west of Stonne, versus Grossdeutschland Regt, 10th Pz Div, dispersed, small detachment attacked Stonne but driven off)
3rd Motorized Infantry Division - Général de brigade Paul-Jean-Léon Bertin-Bossu   (to west of Stonne, dispersed, attacked Stonne but driven off)
4th Armored Division - Général de brigade Charles de Gaulle
 British Expeditionary Force - General Lord Gort
 Directly reporting:
 5th Infantry Division - Major-General Harold Franklyn
 12th Infantry Division - Major-General Roderic Loraine Petre
 23rd Infantry Division - Major-General William Norman Herbert
 46th Infantry Division - Major-General Henry Curtis
 I Corps (UK) - Lieutenant-General Michael Barker succeeded by Major-General Harold Alexander
 1st Infantry Division - Major-General Harold Alexander
 2nd Infantry Division - Major-General Charles Loyd, succeeded by Brigadier Noel Irwin
 48th Infantry Division - Major-General Andrew Thorne
 II Corps (UK) - Lieutenant-General Alan Brooke succeeded by Major-General Bernard Montgomery
 3rd Infantry Division - Major-General Bernard Montgomery, succeeded by Brigadier Kenneth Anderson
4th Infantry Division - Major-General Dudley Johnson
 50th Infantry Division - Major-General Giffard Le Quesne Martel
 III Corps (UK) - Lieutenant-General Ronald Adam
 42nd Infantry Division - Major-General William Holmes
 44th Infantry Division - Major-General Edmund Osborne

Belgian Army
The Belgian Army field approximately 600,000 personnel in 22 divisions, backed by 1,338 artillery pieces, 10 tanks and 240 other combat vehicles. King Leopold III of Belgium had assumed personal command of the army upon mobilization. His principal military advisor was Lieutenant-general Raoul van Overstraeten, while General-major Oscar Michiels was Chief of the General Staff.

 I Corps - Lieutenant-general Alexis van der Veken
 4th Infantry Division
 7th Reserve Infantry Division
 II Corps - Lieutenant-general Victor Michem
 6th Infantry Division
 14th Reserve Infantry Division
 III Corps - Lieutenant-general Joseph de Krahe
 2nd Infantry Division
 3rd Infantry Division
 IV Corps - Lieutenant-general André Bogaerts
 12th Reserve Infantry Division
 15th Reserve Infantry Division
 18th Reserve Infantry Division
 V Corps - Lieutenant-general Edouard Van den Bergen
 13th Reserve Infantry Division
 17th Reserve Infantry Division
 VI Corps - Lieutenant-general Fernand Verstraete
 5th Infantry Division
 10th Reserve Infantry Division
 VII Corps - Lieutenant-general Georges Deffontaine
 8th Reserve Infantry Division
 2nd Chasseurs Ardennais Division
 Cavalry Corps - Lieutenant-general Maximilien de Neve de Roden
 1st Infantry Division
 14th Reserve Infantry Division
 2nd Cavalry Division
 Group Ninitte
 Group K - Lieutenant-general Maurice Keyaerts
 1st Cavalry Division
 1st Chasseurs Ardennais Division
 General Reserve
 11th Reserve Infantry Division
 16th Reserve Infantry Division

Luxembourg Army 
The Luxembourg army (the Corps des Gendarmes et Voluntaries) was made up of two companies. The first company, the Volunteer Corps, was Luxembourg’s main army during the invasions. The second company was the Corps des Gendarmes Luxembourg’s gendarmarie force.

 Corps des Gendarmes et Voluntaries - Émile Speller
 Volunteer Corps - Captain Aloyse Jacoby
 auxiliary unit
 Corps des Gendarmes - Captain Maurice Stein

French Second Army Group 

The French 2nd Army Group was responsible for manning the bulk of the Maginot Line from Montmédy to south of Strasbourg, and controlled three armies. General de Armee Andre-Gaston Pretelat was Commander-in-Chief of the army group throughout its existence.
 Directly reporting to the Army Group:
 87th African Infantry Division
 4th Colonial Infantry Division
 Third Army - General Charles-Marie Condé
 Directly reporting:
 3rd Light Cavalry Division - General Petiet
 6th Infantry Division - General Lucien
 6th North African Infantry Division - General de Verdilhac
 6th Colonial Infantry Division - General Carles
 7th Infantry Division
 8th Infantry Division
 French Colonial Corps
 2nd Infantry Division - General Klopfenstein
 British 51st (Highland) Infantry Division - Major-General Victor Fortune
 56th Infantry Division
 6th Corps
 26th Infantry Division
 42nd Infantry Division
 24th Corps - General Fougère
 51st Infantry Division - General Boell
 42nd Corps - General Sivot
 20th Infantry Division - General Corbe
 58th Infantry Division - General Perraud
 Fourth Army - General Edouard Réquin
 Directly reporting:
 Polish 1st Infantry Division - General Bronisław Duch
 45th Infantry division - General Roux
 9th Corps - General Laure
 11th Infantry Division - General Arlabosse
 47th Infantry Division - General Mendras
 20th Corps - General Hubert
 52nd Infantry Division
 82nd African Infantry Division
 Fifth Army - General Victor Bourret
 Directly reporting:
 44th Infantry Division
 8th Corps
 24th Infantry Division
 31st Infantry Division
 12th Corps
 16th Infantry Division
 35th Infantry Division
 70th Infantry Division
 17th Corps
 62nd Infantry Division
 103rd Infantry Division
 43rd Corps
 30th Infantry Division

French Third Army Group 

The 3rd Army Group was responsible for manning the southern end of the Maginot Line, along the River Rhine and controlled one army. The army group's Commander-in-Chief was Général d'Armée Antoine-Marie-Benoit Besson.
 Eighth Army - General Marcel Garchery
 7th Corps
 13th Infantry Division
 27th Infantry Division
 13th Corps
 19th Infantry Division
 54th Infantry Division
 104th Fortress Division
 105th Fortress Division
 44th Corps
 67th Infantry Division
 45th Corps
 57th Infantry Division
 63rd Infantry Division
 Polish Second Infantry Fusiliers Division - Brigadier-General Bronisław Prugar-Ketling

Royal Netherlands Army 
The Netherlands had four corps, one motorized division and a defense division deployed to begin the battle. Total strength was 240,000 personnel, equipped with 676 artillery pieces and 32 armoured cars. Generaal Henri Winkelman was Supreme Commander of the Royal Netherlands Army and Navy.
 Field Army Command - Luitenant-generaal Godfried van Voorst tot Voorst
 II Corps - Generaal-majoor Jacob Harberts
 2nd Division
 4th Division
 III Corps - Generaal-majoor Adrianus van Nijnatten
 5th Division
 6th Division
  Light Division (Attached)
  Peel Division (Attached)
 IV Corps - Generaal-majoor Adrianus van den Bent
 7th Division
 8th Division
 A, B, G Brigades
 I Corps - Generaal-majoor Nicolaas Carstens
 1st Division
 3rd Division

French army facing Italy 
 Armee des Alps Commanded by Général d'Armée René Olry
 3 infantry divisions of type B
14th Army Corps
15th Army Corps
 Fortification sectors: Dauphiné, Savoie, Alpes Maritimes
 Defence sectors: Rhône, Nice

Originally the French Sixth Army, the Army of the Alps was responsible for manning the southeast frontier with Italy.  Overall, French forces in the region numbered about 35,000 soldiers.

French reserves 

The French began the battle with three reserve corps positioned behind the army groups.  The VII and XXIII Corps were stationed behind the 2nd and 3rd Army Groups.

The following divisions were also kept in reserve:
 10th Infantry Division
 14th Infantry Division
 23rd Infantry Division
 28th Infantry Division
 29th Infantry Division
 36th Infantry Division
 43rd Infantry Division
 1st North African Infantry Division
 7th North African Infantry Division
 5th Colonial Infantry Division
 7th Colonial Infantry Division

British Expeditionary Force

Axis 
The commander-in-chief of the Oberkommando des Heeres (OKH) was Generaloberst Walter von Brauchitsch. Initially the Axis forces consisted of the forces of the German army. They were joined in the conflict by the Italian army on 10 June.

OKH Reserve
 Second Army - General der Kavallerie Maximilian von Weichs
 Directly reporting:
 267th Infantry Division
 294th Infantry Division
 IX Corps - General der Infanterie Hermann Geyer
 15th Infantry Division
 205th Infantry Division
 XXVI Corps - General der Artillerie Albert Wodrig
 34th Infantry Division
 45th Infantry Division
 295th Infantry Division
 VI Corps - General der Pioniere Otto-Wilhelm Förster 
 5th Infantry Division
 293rd Infantry Division
 Ninth Army - Generaloberst Johannes Blaskowitz
 Directly reporting:
 211th Infantry Division
 XXXXII Corps - General der Pioniere Walter Kuntze
 50th Infantry Division
 291st Infantry Division
 XXXXIII Corps - Generalleutnant Hermann Ritter von Speck, from 31 May Generalleutnant Franz Böhme
 88th Infantry Division
 96th Infantry Division
 292nd Infantry Division
 XVIII Corps - General der Infanterie Eugen Beyer, from 5 June Generalleutnant Hermann Ritter von Speck
 25th Infantry Division
 81st Infantry Division
 290th Infantry Division

German Army Group A
Commanded by Generaloberst Gerd von Rundstedt (Chief of Staff: Generalleutnant Georg von Sodenstern)

 Fourth Army - Generaloberst Günther von Kluge (Chief of Staff: Generalmajor Kurt Brennecke)
 II Corps - General der Infanterie Adolf Strauß -> 30.5.1940 General der Infanterie Carl-Heinrich von Stülpnagel
 12th Infantry Division - Generalmajor Walther von Seydlitz-Kurzbach
 32nd Infantry Division - Generalleutnant Franz Böhme
 V Corps - General der Infanterie Richard Ruoff
 211th Infantry Division - Generalmajor Kurt Renner
 251st Infantry Division - Generalmajor Hans Kratzert
 263rd Infantry Division - Generalmajor Franz Karl
 VIII Corps - General der Infanterie Walter Heitz
 8th Infantry Division - Generalmajor Rudolf Koch-Erpach
 28th Infantry Division - Generalleutnant Hans von Obstfelder -> 20.5.1940 Generalmajor Johann Sinnhuber
 87th Infantry Division - Generalmajor Bogislav von Studnitz
 267th Infantry Division - Generalmajor Ernst Fessmann
 XV Corps - General der Infanterie Hermann Hoth (dispositions north to south: Yvoir-Houx-Dinant)
 5th Panzer Division - Generalleutnant Max von Hartlieb -> 22.5.1940 Generalleutnant Joachim Lemelsen -> 6.6.1940 Generalmajor Ludwig Cruwell
 7th Panzer Division - Generalmajor Erwin Rommel 
 62nd Infantry Division - Generalmajor Walter Keiner
 Twelfth Army - Generaloberst Wilhelm List (Chief of Staff: Generalleutnant Eberhard von Mackensen)
 III Corps - General der Artillerie Curt Haase
 3rd Infantry Division - Generalleutnant Walter Lichel
 23rd Infantry Division - Generalleutnant Walter von Brockdorff-Ahlefeldt
 52nd Infantry Division - Generalleutnant Hans-Jurgen von Arnim
 VI Corps - General of Engineers Otto-Wilhelm Förster
 16th Infantry Division - Generalmajor Heinrich Krampf
 24th Infantry Division - Generalmajor Justin von Obernitz -> 1.6.1940 Generalmajor Hans-Valentin Hube
 XVIII Corps - General der Infanterie Eugen Beyer -> 1.6. Generalleutnant Hermann Ritter von Speck
 5th Infantry Division - Generalleutnant Wilhelm Fahrmbacher
 21st Infantry Division - Generalmajor Otto Sponheimer
 25th Infantry Division - Generalleutnant Erich Clößner
 1st Mountain Division - Generalleutnant Ludwig Kübler
 Sixteenth Army - General der Infanterie Ernst Busch (Chief of Staff: Generalmajor Walter Model)
 VII Corps - General der Infanterie Eugen von Schobert
 36th Infantry Division - Generalleutnant Georg Lindemann
 68th Infantry Division - Generalmajor Georg Braun
 XIII Corps - Generalleutnant Heinrich von Vietinghoff
 15th Infantry Division - Generalmajor Friedrich-Wilhelm von Chappuis
 17th Infantry Division - Generalmajor Herbert Loch
 10th Infantry Division - Generalmajor Konrad von Cochenhausen
 XXIII Corps - Generalleutnant Albrecht Schubert
 34th Infantry Division - Generalmajor Hans Behlendorff
 58th Infantry Division - Generalmajor Iwan Heunert
 76th Infantry Division - Generalmajor Maximilian de Angelis
 26th Infantry Division - Generalmajor Sigismund von Förster
 Panzer Group Kleist - General der Kavallerie Paul Ludwig Ewald von Kleist (Chief of Staff: Generalmajor Kurt Zeitzler)
 XIV Corps - General der Infanterie Gustav Anton von Wietersheim
 2nd Infantry Division (mot.) - Generalleutnant Paul Bader
 13th Infantry Division (mot.) - Generalmajor Friedrich-Wilhelm von Rothkirch und Panthen
 29th Infantry Division (mot.) - Generalmajor Willibald Freiherr von Langermann und Erlencamp
 XXXXI Corps - Generalleutnant Georg-Hans Reinhardt (disposition of Panzer Corps north to south, Montherme)
 6th Panzer Division - Generalmajor Werner Kempf
 8th Panzer Division - Oberst Erich Brandenberger
 XIX Corps - General der Kavallerie Heinz Guderian  (dispositions east to west: Donchery to Sedan)
 2nd Panzer Division - Generalleutnant Rudolf Veiel  
 1st Panzer Division - Generalleutnant Friedrich Kirchner
 10th Panzer Division - Generalleutnant Ferdinand Schaal  
 Infantry Regiment Großdeutschland
 Reserves
 XXXX Corps - Generalleutnant Georg Stumme
 6th Infantry Division - Generalleutnant Arnold Freiherr von Biegeleben
 9th Infantry Division - Generalleutnant Georg von Apell
 4th Infantry Division - Generalleutnant Erick-Oskar Hansen
 27th Infantry Division - Generalleutnant Friedrich Bergmann
 71st Infantry Division - Generalleutnant Karl Weisenberger
 73rd Infantry Division - Generalleutnant Bruno Bieler

German Army Group B
Commanded by Generaloberst Fedor von Bock (Chief of Staff: Generalleutnant Hans von Salmuth)
 Sixth Army - Generaloberst Walter von Reichenau (Chief of Staff: Generalmajor Friedrich Paulus)
 XVI Corps - General der Kavallerie Erich Hoepner
 4th Infantry Division - Generalleutnant Erick-Oskar Hansen
 33rd Infantry Division - Generalmajor Rudolf Sintzenich
 3rd Panzer Division - Generalmajor Horst Stumpff
 4th Panzer Division - Generalmajor Ludwig Radlmeier -> 8.6.1940 Generalmajor Johann Joachim Stever
 IV Corps - General der Infanterie Viktor von Schwedler
 15th Infantry Division - Generalmajor Ernst-Eberhard Hell
 205th Infantry Division - Generalleutnant Ernst Richter
 XI Corps - Generalleutnant Joachim von Kortzfleisch
 7th Infantry Division - Generalmajor Eccard Freiherr von Gablenz
 211th Infantry Division - Generalmajor Kurt Renner
 31st Infantry Division - Generalleutnant Rudolf Kaempfe
 IX Corps - General der Infanterie Hermann Geyer
 XXVII Corps - General der Infanterie Alfred Wäger
 253th Infantry Division - Generalleutnant Fritz Kuhne
 269th Infantry Division - Generalmajor Ernst-Eberhard Hell
 Eighteenth Army - General der Artillerie Georg von Küchler
 Reporting Directly 
1st Cavalry Division - Major General Kurt Feldt
X Corps - General Christian Hansen
 SS "Adolf Hitler" Reinforced Regiment - Sepp Dietrich
 227th Infantry Division
207th Infantry Division
SS "Der Fuhrer" Reinforced Regiment (Detached from SS "Verfugungstruppe" Division) 
 XXVI Corps - General Albert Wodrig
 256th Infantry Division
 254th Infantry Division
 SS "Verfügungstruppe" Division (Less one Regiment "Der Fuhrer") - ss-Gruppenfuhrer Paul Hausser
9th Panzer Division - Major General Alfred Ritter Von Hubicki
 XXXIX Corps (Activated 13 May 1940) – Lieutenant General Rudolf Schmidt
Reserves
208th Infantry Division
225th Infantry Division
526th Infantry Division
Air Landing Corps (Under Luftwaffe control)
 7th Air Division
 22nd Air Landing Infantry Division

German Army Group C
Commanded by Generaloberst Wilhelm Ritter von Leeb
 First Army - Generaloberst Erwin von Witzleben
 Directly reporting:
 197th Infantry Division
 Höh. Kom. z.b.V. XXXVII - Generalleutnant Alfred Böhm-Tettelbach
 246th Infantry Division
 215th Infantry Division
 262nd Infantry Division
 257th Infantry Division
 XXIV Corps - General der Panzertruppe Leo Geyr von Schweppenburg
 60th Infantry Division
 252nd Infantry Division
 168th Infantry Division
 XII Corps - Generaloberst  Gotthard Heinrici
 75th Infantry Division
 268th Infantry Division
 198th Infantry Division
 XXX Corps - General der Artillerie Otto Hartmann
 258th Infantry Division
 93rd Infantry Division
 79th Infantry Division
 Höh. Kom. z.b.V. XXXXV - General der Infanterie Kurt von Greiff
 95th Infantry Division
 167th Infantry Division
 Seventh Army - Generaloberst Friedrich Dollmann
 Höh. Kom. z.b.V. XXXIII - General der Kavallerie Georg Brandt
 213th Infantry Division
 554th Infantry Division
 556th Infantry Division
 239th Infantry Division
 XXV Corps - General der Infanterie Karl Ritter von Prager
 557th Infantry Division
 555th Infantry Division
 6th Mountain Division
 Directly reporting:
 218th Infantry Division
 221st Infantry Division

Italian Army Group "West"
Commanded by Prince General Umberto di Savoia
 1st Army - General Pietro Pintor
 II Army Corps - General Francesco Bertini
 III Army Corps - General Mario Arisio
 XV Army Corps - General Gastone Gambara
 4th Army - General Alfredo Guzzoni
 I Army Corps - General Carlo Vecchiarelli
 IV Army Corps - General Camillo Mercalli
 Alpine Army Corps - General Luigi Negri Cesi

Overall, the Italian forces numbered about 312,000 troops. However they had inadequate artillery and transport and most were not equipped for the cold Alpine environment.

Notes

References

 
 
 
 
War over Holland May 1940: The Dutch struggle
 

Battle of France
World War II orders of battle